Harry James Dale (23 April 1899 – 5 February 1985) was an English professional football goalkeeper who played in the Football League for Reading.

Career statistics

References 

English footballers
Brentford F.C. players
English Football League players
Southern Football League players
1899 births
1985 deaths
Footballers from Woolwich
Association football goalkeepers
Reading F.C. players